Mark Williams (born 13 April 1983) is an indigenous former Australian rules football player who played with the Hawthorn Football Club and Essendon Football Club in the Australian Football League. He was traded from the Hawks to the Bombers during the 2009 AFL trade week.

Making his debut in 2002 after being drafted by the Hawks at pick 43 in the 2000 AFL Draft, Williams was originally a small forward, but coach Alastair Clarkson found that he was more useful as a full forward during the 2005 season, where he kicked 63 goals, making him the leading goal kicker of the club. Known for his flamboyance, pace and use of the "shotgun", a trademark celebration he used to use after kicking a goal, Williams was one of a number of young players at Hawthorn.

Williams finished 2006 with a total of 60 goals, again becoming was the leading goalkicker at the Hawks. A knee injury cut short his 2007 season after only four games leaving him stranded on 13 goals.

Williams attracted controversy in 2008 when he made a choking gesture targeted at then-Port Adelaide coach, Mark Williams. This was in reference to the then-Port Adelaide coach's famous choking gesture when the Power won the 2004 Premiership. Williams was warned that he would be "shown the door" if he performed such an action again.

In the 2008 Grand Final, Williams and Stuart Dew kicked four goals in three minutes to put Hawthorn in a winning position late in the third quarter. Williams' three goals was the most by any player during the Grand Final.

In 2009, Williams injured his knee and missed almost half of that season's games.

The 2009 post-season trade week saw Williams traded to Essendon in a complex trade involving four clubs. He had a disappointing debut game for Essendon, when the Bombers were beaten by Geelong at the MCG. It was not a great night for Williams as he gathered just eight disposals and was kept scoreless in the match.

In the twilight of his career, Williams was unable to gain senior selection and played with Essendon's Victorian Football League affiliate the Bendigo Bombers, until his retirement which was announced on 25 July 2011.

Williams agreed to play with Ballan in the Central Highlands Football League for 2012 and 2013.

Williams became the inaugural coach of Western Region Football League club Newport Power at the end of 2015. In his first season in charge, he steered the club to premiership success.

Statistics

|- style=background:#EAEAEA
| 2001 ||  || 6
| 0 || — || — || — || — || — || — || — || — || — || — || — || — || — || — || 0
|-
| 2002 ||  || 6
| 3 || 1 || 1 || 5 || 1 || 6 || 1 || 3 || 0.3 || 0.3 || 1.7 || 0.3 || 2.0 || 0.3 || 1.0 || 0
|- style=background:#EAEAEA
| 2003 ||  || 6
| 9 || 10 || 9 || 43 || 17 || 60 || 30 || 23 || 1.1 || 1.0 || 4.8 || 1.9 || 6.7 || 3.3 || 2.6 || 0
|-
| 2004 ||  || 6
| 21 || 33 || 12 || 86 || 36 || 122 || 46 || 26 || 1.6 || 0.6 || 4.1 || 1.7 || 5.8 || 2.2 || 1.2 || 0
|- style=background:#EAEAEA
| 2005 ||  || 6
| 19 || 63 || 35 || 141 || 20 || 161 || 87 || 25 || 3.3 || 1.8 || 7.4 || 1.1 || 8.5 || 4.6 || 1.3 || 3
|-
| 2006 ||  || 6
| 20 || 60 || 26 || 143 || 34 || 177 || 93 || 22 || 3.0 || 1.3 || 7.2 || 1.7 || 8.9 || 4.7 || 1.1 || 5
|- style=background:#EAEAEA
| 2007 ||  || 6
| 4 || 13 || 5 || 25 || 12 || 37 || 11 || 5 || 3.3 || 1.3 || 6.3 || 3.0 || 9.3 || 2.8 || 1.3 || 0
|-
| bgcolor=F0E68C | 2008# ||  || 6
| 22 || 46 || 32 || 206 || 72 || 278 || 126 || 37 || 2.1 || 1.5 || 9.4 || 3.3 || 12.6 || 5.7 || 1.7 || 3
|- style=background:#EAEAEA
| 2009 ||  || 6
| 13 || 16 || 7 || 106 || 48 || 154 || 64 || 24 || 1.2 || 0.5 || 8.2 || 3.7 || 11.8 || 4.9 || 1.8 || 0
|-
| 2010 ||  || 33
| 4 || 5 || 0 || 25 || 6 || 31 || 8 || 6 || 1.3 || 0.0 || 6.3 || 1.5 || 7.8 || 2.0 || 1.5 || 0
|- style=background:#EAEAEA
| 2011 ||  || 33
| 0 || — || — || — || — || — || — || — || — || — || — || — || — || — || — || 0
|- class="sortbottom"
! colspan=3| Career:
! 115 !! 247 !! 127 !! 780 !! 246 !! 1026 !! 466 !! 171 !! 2.1 !! 1.1 !! 6.8 !! 2.1 !! 8.9 !! 4.1 !! 1.5 !! 11
|}

Honours and achievements
Team
 AFL premiership player: 2008
 VFL premiership player (Box Hill): 2001

Individual
 2× Hawthorn leading goalkicker: 2005, 2006
 Indigenous All-Stars team: 2003

Notes

External links

1983 births
Living people
Australian rules footballers from Western Australia
Hawthorn Football Club players
Hawthorn Football Club Premiership players
Essendon Football Club players
Indigenous Australian players of Australian rules football
South Fremantle Football Club players
People from the Great Southern (Western Australia)
Bendigo Football Club players
Box Hill Football Club players
One-time VFL/AFL Premiership players